Tang-e Badi-ye Bala (also Romanized as Tang-e Bādī-ye Bālā; also known as Tang-e Bādī) is a village in Hangam Rural District, in the Central District of Qir and Karzin County, Fars Province, Iran. At the 2006 census, its population was 31, in 5 families.

References 

Populated places in Qir and Karzin County